The LKL Three-point Shootout, currently known as CBet.lt Three-point Shootout for sponsorship purposes, is a Lithuanian professional King Mindaugas Cup final day contest, that is held between the cup's final and third-place matches. Formerly, it was a part of the LKL's All-Star Day, and took place before the All-Star Game.

The current champion is Rihards Kuksiks, who won second consecutive title representing Pieno Žvaigždės.

History
The very first three-point shootout contest was won by Richard Thomas, of Šilutė, at the 1994 LKL All-Star Day, in Panevėžys.

Rules
Each Lithuanian Basketball League team has a chance to delegate one player for the contest, while the player with the league's best three-point field goal shooting percentage enters automatically.

Competitors try to score as many points as possible, in one minute. There are five ball racks, laid out over the three-point arc: one on each baseline, one halfway between the baseline, and the top of the arc on each side, and one at the top of the arc. Each rack has five balls, four of which are worth one point (the standard orange balls), and the fifth one (a red, white, and blue ball; nicknamed the "money ball"), is worth two points. Thus, a perfect score is 30 points.

In case of an equal result, each player gets 25 seconds to shoot from two racks of their choosing. The contestant(s) with the best results progress further.

In the first round, each contestant has one chance to score as many points as possible. The four best performers advance to the semi-final, where two more are eliminated, while the remaining contenders compete for the title of LKL Sniper.

Shootout champions

See also
LKL All-Star Game
LKL All-Star Day
LKL All-Star Game MVP
LKL Slam Dunk Contest

References 

Lietuvos krepšinio lyga All-Star Game
Recurring sporting events established in 1994
Sports entertainment